Christopher Brooks (born December 19, 1986 in Houston, Texas) is a retired American gymnast, now assistant coach of the Arkansas Razorbacks NCAA gymnastics team. He won four gold medals at the 2012 Pacific Rim Championships. He has trained alongside Olympic and World Championships medalist Jonathan Horton as a junior, college and senior elite gymnast. On August 17, 2017, he announced his retirement from artistic gymnastics.

Early life
Brooks was a highly ranked junior gymnast in high school, where he trained at Houston North gymnastics club, under coach Bill Foster. He was a member of the U.S. junior national team 1999–2001, 2002–2005. In 2003, he was a gold medalist at the USA national championships. In 2004, he suffered a serious injury when his grip locked while training on high bar, resulting in shattering and splintering of the ulna and radius of his right arm.

NCAA

He was a member of the Oklahoma Sooners gymnastics team in college from 2005–2009.  The team were national champions in 2006 and 2008.  Brooks was a multi-year, multi-event All American, and in 2009, was captain of the Sooners men's gymnastics team.

Senior elite career

He returned to elite gymnastics in 2008 when he competed in the US national championships in Houston, Texas. He made a huge comeback at the beginning of 2009 at the Winter Cup coming 5th all-around, 4th on high bar and winning a bronze medal on floor exercise. Due to injury, he was not able to compete fully at the 2009 USA nationals and did not make the national team that year.

After graduating from the University of Oklahoma he returned to Houston to train at Cypress Academy of Gymnastics under coach Tom Meadows, with American teammate Jonathan Horton.

In 2010, he won gold in the all-around and high bar as well as a bronze on the vault at the Winter Cup. He went on to compete at the American Cup where he won bronze in the all-around behind teammate Jonathan Horton and Russian Maxim Devyatovskiy beating the world silver medalist, Daniel Keatings. He went on to compete in the Japan Cup in July helping the USA men's team to a bronze medal finish. Later in the summer, he competed fully in the US national championships in Hartford, Connecticut where he won a gold medal on high bar and silver on parallel bars securing a place on the senior national team. He went on to represent the USA at the 2010 World Artistic Gymnastics Championships in Rotterdam where he helped the team to a 4th place finish, and 6th place finish in the high bar final. After the world championships, he had to have surgeries on his ankles and wrist.

In 2011, he was chosen to be a member of the team Hilton HHonors, a group of male gymnasts sponsored by Hilton Worldwide. He competed in the USA national championships where he won a silver medal on high bar and bronze on parallel bars. He was chosen to  be an alternate for the team representing USA at the 2011 World Artistic Gymnastics Championships in Tokyo where they won the first men's team world medal for the USA, since 2003.

In February 2012, he competed at the Winter Cup, where he won bronze on horizontal bar. In March 12, had an outstanding performance at the Pacific Rim championships, in Everett, Washington, where he led the team to a gold. He went on to win 3 more individual golds as well. At the Visa championships, he showed some inconsistency in his routines, but great potential with difficult moves on high bar and vault. He went on to compete in the Olympic trials where his combined scores placed him in joint 4th place with Jake Dalton. At the announcement of the men's Olympic team on July 1, he was named as an alternate to the 2012 Summer Olympics team.

In 2014, Brooks won the Winter Cup Challenge all-around competition and was named to the U.S. gymnastics men's senior national team.  Later in the year, he was recovering from a hand injury and did not compete in the P&G Championships.

2016 Rio Olympics
On June 25, 2016, Brooks was named to the five-man United States men's gymnastics Olympic team. He represented the United States in August 2016, in the 2016 Summer Olympics in Rio de Janeiro, alongside team members Jake Dalton, Sam Mikulak, Alex Naddour, and Danell Leyva. Brooks finished in second in the all-around at the U.S. Olympic trials in St. Louis. On August 4, 2016, it was reported by the Houston Chronicle, that Brooks had been named captain of the US men's Olympic gymnastics team.  In Rio, Brooks finished 14th in the individual men’s all around competition.

Personal life

Brooks's father, Larry, was also a gymnast which is how he got involved with the sport. Both Brooks' brother and sister have had involvement in gymnastics as well. His father died in a car accident in 2008. After he graduated and trained an additional year at the University of Oklahoma, his brother, Nick coached him for two years.

As of February 2017, he has been in a relationship with 2012 Olympic gymnast Jordyn Wieber.  They announced their engagement on October 5, 2021.

References

External links
 
 
 Meet the Elite: Chris Brooks (Gymnastike video)
 2012 Hopeful:Chris Brooks (USAG video)

1986 births
Living people
American male artistic gymnasts
Sportspeople from Houston
Oklahoma Sooners men's gymnasts
Gymnasts at the 2016 Summer Olympics
Olympic gymnasts of the United States